Metalloreductase STEAP3 is an enzyme that in humans is encoded by the STEAP3 gene.

STEAP3 is a metalloreductase, capable of converting iron from an insoluble ferric (Fe3+) to a soluble  ferrous (Fe2+) form.

STEAP3 and other STEAP protein, with the exception of STEAP1, are predicted to contain a Di-nucleotide binding domain (Rossmann Fold). This has been shown using X-ray crystallography in the cases of STEAP3 and STEAP4 (PDB: 2VNS, 2VQ3 and 2YJZ).

Interactions 

STEAP3 has been shown to interact with BNIP3L and PKMYT1.

References

Further reading 

 
 
 
 
 
 

EC 1.16.1